"A Slow Fade to Black" was an American television film broadcast by NBC on March 27, 1964, as part of the television series, Bob Hope Presents the Chrysler Theatre. Rod Serling wrote the screenplay, and Benny Carter provided the music. Rod Steiger starred and was nominated for an Emmy for outstanding performance by an actor in a leading role.

Plot
Mike Kirsch (played by Rod Steiger) is the once-powerful head of Globe-Kirsch studios whose last six films have all lost money. His assistant Peter Furgatch (played by Robert Culp) conveys a message that the studio's directors want him to resign. Kirsch tries to secure his control of the studio with the shares owned by his wife (played by Anna Lee) and his rebellious daughter (played by Sally Kellerman). His daughter refuses to support him.

At a meeting of the board of directors, Kirsch pitches a spectacular new movie but is asked for his resignation. At a dinner honoring Kirsch as "Producer of the Year", Furgatch informs him that he has been appointed as the new head of the studio. Kirsch announces his resignation at the dinner. He later cries as he watches his early movies.

Cast
The cast included performances by:

 Rod Steiger as Mike Kirsch
 Sally Kellerman as Jerrie Kirsch
 Robert Culp as Peter Furgatch
 Bob Hope as Host
 James Dunn as Russ Landers
 Anna Lee as Paula Kirsch
 Woodrow Parfrey as Kessler
 Simon Scott as Henderson
 Marian Moses as The Secretary
 Scott Elliott as Grannigan
 Dennis McCarthy as The Man
 Clegg Hoyt as The Guard
 Leon Belasco as Robbins
 Sharon Farrell as Melissa

Production
The production was broadcast by NBC on March 27, 1964, as part of the television series, Bob Hope Presents the Chrysler Theatre. Rod Serling wrote the screenplay. It was his third screenplay for the series. Dick Berg was the producer and Ron Winston the director. Benny Carter provided the music.

Rod Steiger starred and was nominated for an Emmy for outstanding performance by an actor in a leading role.

References

1964 American television episodes
Bob Hope Presents the Chrysler Theatre